Shaobo Lake is a freshwater lake in Jiangsu Province, China, it is located between Gaoyou and Yangzhou. Shaobo Lake is a part of the Huai River system as the Huai River flows south through Shaobo Lake on its way to the Yangtze River like Gaoyou Lake. It is about 17 km long and 6 km wide, covering approximately 77 km2.

Notes

Lakes of Jiangsu
Huai River